A Notice to Airmen/Notice to Air Men/Notice to Airman/Notice to Air Missions (NOTAM) is a notice filed with an aviation authority to alert aircraft pilots of potential hazards along a flight route or at a location that could affect the flight. NOTAMs are notices or advisories that contain information concerning the establishment, conditions or change in any aeronautical facility, service, procedure or hazard, the timely knowledge of which may be essential to personnel and systems concerned with flight operations. NOTAMs are created and transmitted by government agencies and airport operators under guidelines specified by Annex 15: Aeronautical Information Services of the Convention on International Civil Aviation (CICA). The acronym NOTAM came into common use following the ratification of the CICA, which came into effect on 4 April 1947. Notices to airmen were normally published in a regular publication by each country's air authorities (e.g., in Flight International magazine in the UK). Several developments and amendments to the CICA have resulted in the more automated system available today.

A NOTAM is filed with an aviation authority to alert aircraft pilots of any hazards en route or at a specific location. The authority, in turn, provides a means of disseminating relevant NOTAMs to pilots.

Usage
NOTAMs are issued (and reported) for several reasons, such as:
 hazards, including air shows, parachute jumps, kite flying, lasers, rocket launches, etc.
 flights by important people such as heads of state (which sometimes involve temporary flight restrictions, TFRs)
 closed runways
 inoperable radio navigational aids
 military exercises with resulting airspace restrictions
 inoperable lights on tall obstructions
 temporary erection of obstacles near airfields (e.g., cranes)
 passage of flocks of birds through airspace (a NOTAM in this category is known as a BIRDTAM)
 notifications of runway/taxiway/apron status concerning snow, ice, and standing water (a SNOWTAM)
 notification of an operationally significant change in volcanic ash or other dust contamination (an ASHTAM)
 software code risk announcements with associated patches to reduce specific vulnerabilities

Aviation authorities typically exchange NOTAMs over Aeronautical Fixed Telecommunication Network (AFTN) circuits.

Software allows pilots to identify NOTAMs near their intended route or at the intended destination. Some complain that the volume and increasing triviality of NOTAMs has reduced their usefulness.

In the U.S. Air Force information technology enterprise, C4 NOTAMs (command, control, communications, and computer notices to airmen) are notices of new or updated Air Force Network Operating Instructions (AFNOIs). Often, these notices serve to direct Air Force computer administrators to install security updates or change the configuration of computer systems.

Criticism 
In July 2017, Air Canada Flight 759 nearly crashed into four other airliners as it attempted to land on a San Francisco taxiway misidentified as a runway: the adjacent runway was closed, but the information was buried in the NOTAM. As a consequence, in September 2018, from the findings during its investigation, the National Transportation Safety Board (NTSB) stated NOTAMs were unintelligible and ignored and recommended a more effective information presentation for better relevance. NTSB chairman Robert Sumwalt described NOTAMs as "a bunch of garbage that nobody pays any attention to". This led to an initiative of the International Civil Aviation Organization (ICAO) to reform the NOTAM system.

Flight planning applications for electronic flight bag can help decipher and better organize NOTAMs.

Format
The following describes ICAO NOTAMs. NOTAMs are published using all upper case letters. Some countries, such as the United States, may diverge from the following ICAO standards.

 The first line contains NOTAM identification (series, sequence number, and year of issue), the type of operation (NEW, REPLACE, or CANCEL), as well as a reference to a previously issued NOTAM (for NOTAMR and NOTAMC only).
 The "Q" line holds information about whom the NOTAM affects, along with a basic NOTAM description. This line can be encoded/decoded from tables defined by ICAO. This allows NOTAMs to be displayed electronically
 The "A" line is the ICAO code of the affected aerodrome or FIR for the NOTAM. The area of influence of the NOTAM can be several hundred kilometers from the originating aerodrome.
 The "B" line contains the start date and time, and the "C" line contains the finish date and time of the NOTAM. Fields "B" and "C" are in the format YYMMDDhhmm, with times given in Universal Co-ordinated Time, also known as UTC or Zulu time.
 Sometimes a "D" line may be present. This gives a miscellaneous diurnal time for the NOTAM if the hours of effect are less than 24 hours a day, e.g., parachute dropping exercises tend to occur for short periods of a few hours during the day, but may be repeated over many days.
 The "E" line is the full NOTAM description. It is in English but can be heavily abbreviated. These abbreviations can be encoded/decoded by tables defined by ICAO.
 When present, "F" and "G" lines detail the height/altitude restrictions of the NOTAM. Typically SFC means surface height or ground level, and UNL is unlimited height. Other heights are given in feet, flight level, or a combination of the two.

Example

This is a typical NOTAM for London Heathrow airport:
A1234/06 NOTAMR A1212/06
Q)EGTT/QMXLC/IV/NBO/A/000/999/5129N00028W005
A)EGLL
B)0609050500
C)0704300500
E)DUE WIP TWY B SOUTH CLSD BTN 'F' AND 'R'. TWY 'R' CLSD BTN 'A' AND 'B' AND DIVERTED VIA NEW GREEN CL AND BLUE EDGE LGT. CTN ADZ

This decodes into the following:
Series and number: A1234 issued in 2006 (06)
Nature of the NOTAM: Replacing (R) NOTAM A1212 issued in 2006 (06)

 FIR: London FIR (EGTT)
 Subject: Taxiway (MX)
 Condition: Closed (LC)
 Traffic: NOTAM issued for IFR (I) flights and VFR flights (V)
 Purpose: NOTAM selected for immediate attention of flight crew members (N), for PIB (Pre-flight Information Bulletin) entry (B), concerning flight operations (O)
 Scope: Aerodrome (A)
 Limits: FL 000 to FL 999 (000/999)
 Geographical location: 51°29' N 000° 28' W (5129N00028W)
 Operation radius of the NOTAM: 5 NM (005)

 Aerodrome: London Heathrow (EGLL)

 From: 05:00 UTC 5 September 2006 (060905 0500)
 Until: 05:00 UTC 30 April 2007 (070430 0500)
 Category: Aerodromes, air routes, and ground aids
 Description: Due to work in progress (DUE WIP), taxiway "B South" is closed between "F" and "R" (TWY B SOUTH CLSD BTN 'F' AND 'R'). Taxiway "R" is closed between "A" and "B" (TWY 'R' CLSD BTN 'A' AND 'B') and is diverted via a new green centre line and blue edge lighting (AND DIVERTED VIA NEW GREEN CL AND BLUE EDGE LGT). Caution advised (CTN ADZ).

U.S. domestic NOTAMs
In the United States, NOTAMs are classified by the FAA into five categories:

NOTAM (D) or distant NOTAMs
A NOTAM (D) information is disseminated for all navigational facilities that are part of the National Airspace System (NAS), all public use airports, seaplane bases, and heliports listed in the Airport/Facility Directory (A/FD) (e.g., such information as whether or not an airport or a certain facility is usable). NOTAM (D) information includes, among other topics, such data as taxiway closures, personnel and equipment near or crossing runways, and airport lighting aids that do not affect instrument approach criteria, such as VASI.

Flight Data Center (FDC) NOTAMs
The National Flight Data Center will issue these NOTAMs when it becomes necessary to disseminate information that is regulatory in nature, and they contain such things as amendments to published IAPs and other current aeronautical charts. They are also used to advertise temporary flight restrictions caused by such things as natural disasters or large-scale public events that may generate congestion of air traffic over a site.

Pointer NOTAMs
NOTAMs issued by a flight service station to highlight or point out another NOTAM, such as an FDC or NOTAM (D) NOTAM. This type of NOTAM will assist users in cross-referencing important information that may not be found under an airport or NAVAID identifier.

Special activity airspace (SAA) NOTAMs
SAA NOTAMs are issued when SAA (the term "SAA" includes SUA, as well as instrument and visual military training routes, aerial refueling tracks and anchors) will be active outside the published schedule times and when required by the published schedule.

Military NOTAMs
NOTAMs pertaining to U.S. Air Force, Army, Marine, and Navy navigational aids/airports that are part of the NAS.

Incidents 
On 11 January 2023, the US NOTAM system failed, which grounded all domestic flights until 9:00 AM EST (UTC-5) the same day.

See also
 Notice to mariners — marine equivalent

References

External links
 The Annual Greece v Turkey NOTAM Battle -  OPSGROUP
PilotWeb FAA NOTAM
NOTAM Search (retrieval of Letters to Airmen) FAA
NOTAM dinsQueryWeb
NOTAM decoder - drorpilot
http://ead.dhmi.gov.tr/ Turkish NOTAM display and database 
NOTAM tutorial
Aviation abbreviations - Civil Aviation Safety Authority
 

Air traffic control
Aircraft operations
Aviation publications